The first inauguration of Abraham Lincoln as the 16th president of the United States was held on Monday, March 4, 1861, at the East Portico of the United States Capitol in Washington, D.C. This was the 19th inauguration and marked the commencement of the first, and eventually only full term of Abraham Lincoln as president and the only term of Hannibal Hamlin as vice president. The presidential oath of office was administered to Lincoln by Roger B. Taney, the Chief Justice of the United States. John C. Breckinridge became the first outgoing vice president to administer the vice-presidential oath of office to his successor.

This was the first time Lincoln appeared in public with a beard, which he had begun growing after being elected president, in response to a written request by 11-year-old Grace Bedell. This effectively made him the first president to have any facial hair beyond sideburns.

On Inauguration Day, Lincoln's procession to the Capitol was surrounded by heavily armed cavalry and infantry, providing an unprecedented amount of protection for the President-elect as the nation stood on the brink of war. During the  weeks between Lincoln's victory in the 1860 presidential election and Inauguration Day, seven slave states had declared their secession from the Union and formed the Confederate States of America.

Train ride to Washington

An entourage of family and friends left Springfield, Illinois, with Lincoln on February 11 to travel by train to Washington, D.C. for the inauguration. This group including his wife, three sons, and brother-in-law, as well as John G. Nicolay, John M. Hay, Ward Hill Lamon, David Davis, Norman B. Judd, Edwin Vose Sumner, as well as his African-American valet and bodyguard, William Henry Johnson. Just before leaving, he gave his farewell address, which was one of Lincoln's most emotional as he and the public knew that he might be killed before he could return to Springfield. Such fears would be realized in 1865 when he was assassinated; he never would return to Springfield alive after his address.

For the next ten days, he traveled widely throughout the country, with stops in Indianapolis, Columbus, Pittsburgh, Cleveland, Buffalo, Albany, New York City, and south to Philadelphia, where on the afternoon of February 21, he pulled into Kensington Station.  Lincoln took an open carriage to the Continental Hotel, with almost 100,000 spectators waiting to catch a glimpse of the President-elect.  There he met Mayor Alexander Henry, and delivered some remarks to the crowd outside from a hotel balcony.  Lincoln continued on to Harrisburg. Then, because of an alleged assassination conspiracy, Lincoln traveled through Baltimore, Maryland, on a special train in the middle of the night, transferring from the President Street Station to the Camden Station at 3:30 a.m., before finally completing his journey in Washington. Johnson was the only person from the Illinois entourage to travel with Lincoln from Baltimore to Washington.

Plot to seize the District of Columbia and install Breckinridge as president
Stephen Douglas, Lincoln's rival from Illinois, who defeated him for Senator and was defeated by him in the 1860 U.S. presidential election, warned in January of 1860 that "a widespread and intricate conspiracy" was planning to seize the District of Columbia and install Breckinridge as president (Lincoln having never arrived in Washington).

See also

Presidency of Abraham Lincoln
Second inauguration of Abraham Lincoln
1860 United States presidential election
Lincoln Bible
Abraham Lincoln's first inaugural address

References

External links
More documents from the Library of Congress
Text of Lincoln's First Inaugural Address

Inauguration 1861
Lincoln inaug
Lincoln inaug
Lincoln 1861
March 1861 events